Enangudi is the main village which is unified with neighbouring villages like Adalaiyur, Karipakkam, Ketharimangalam, Putthagaram, Kayathoor, Karuppuoor, Thepiramangalam, Vawvaladi and Pakkam Kottor.

The nearest town of significant size is Tiruvarur which is 16 km away, Mayiladuthurai is 30 km and Nagapattinam is around 28 km away. The nearest Railway station is Nannilam (Sannanaloor).

Enangudi has all the basic facilities such as secondary education, primary health, veterinary health and banking.

Bank
Indian overseas bank
tamilnad mercantile bank (Puthagaram)

Places of worship
MASJID:

East Jumma masjid
Middle masjid
Big masjid
Masjidul Aqsa
Ketharimangalam masjid
Tamil Nadu Thowheed Jamath Markas
Thowheed Markas without any organization
One Masjid in Vawvaladi
Two Masjids in Pakkam Kottor.

   And

TEMPLES:

Sivan Temple
7 virgo temple
Agaya Mariyamman temple
Selva vinayagar temple
Pidari Amman Temple
Kaliyamman Temple
Aiyyanar Temple
Vinayagar Temple

Schools 
1.      Government higher secondary School +12

2.      Government Elementary School 5 th

3.      Al Aman Crescent School +12

4.      Al-kathereyaa Matriculation hr. sec School +12

5.      SMT School 8th

People

Most of them own rice fields (Max. leased to sub farmers) and it is a means of income for them.

The majority of the population are Muslims, and most of the males are working in foreign countries like Singapore, Malaysia, Kuwait, Saudi Arabia, and UAE.  Manual labour is rapidly decreasing due to the government's 100-day jobs. TNTJ is a fast growing organization and T.M.M.k is the major community organization. T.M.M.K and M.J.K were providing ambulance services.

ENANGUDI -609701. is hosting the national PIN CODE-609 701 (Post Code).

Villages in Nagapattinam district